Surface freezing is the appearance of long-range crystalline order in a near-surface layer of a liquid. The surface freezing effect is opposite to a far more common surface melting, or premelting. Surface Freezing was experimentally discovered in melts of alkanes and related chain molecules in the early 1990s independently by two groups. John Earnshaw and his group (Queen's University of Belfast) used light scattering, which did not allow a determination of the frozen layer's thickness, and whether or not it is laterally ordered. A group led by Ben Ocko (Brookhaven National Laboratory), Eric Sirota (Exxon) and Moshe Deutsch (Bar-Ilan University, Israel) discovered independently the same effect, using x-ray surface diffraction which allowed them to show that the frozen layer is a crystalline monolayer, with molecules oriented roughly along the surface normal, and ordered in an hexagonal lattice. A related effect, the existence of a smectic phase at the surface of a nematic liquid bulk was observed in liquid crystals by Jens Als-Nielsen (Risø National Laboratory, Denmark) and Peter Pershan (Harvard University) in the early 1980s. However, the surface layer there was neither ordered, nor confined to a single layer. Surface freezing has since been found in a wide range of chain molecules and at various interfaces: liquid-air, liquid-solid and liquid-liquid.

Phases of matter